Noppawan Lertcheewakarn was the defending champions having won the event in 2015, but chose not to participate in this edition.

Luksika Kumkhum won the gold medal, defeating Anna Clarice Patrimonio in the final, 6–0, 6–1.

Stefanie Tan and Andrea Ka won the bronze medals.

Medalists

Seeds

Draw

External links
 Draw

Women's Singles
South
South